Kakasa Ka Ba sa Grade 5? is a Philippine television game show broadcast by GMA Network. The show is the Philippine version of Are You Smarter than a 5th Grader?. Hosted by Janno Gibbs, it premiered on October 27, 2007. The first season concluded on March 29, 2008. It was replaced by Pinoy Idol on its timeslot. The show returned for its second season on November 8, 2008 replacing Celebrity Duets. The show concluded on May 9, 2009 with a total of 47 episodes. It was replaced by Are You the Next Big Star? in its timeslot.

The show is announced under the proposed title Are You Smarter Than a Fifth Grader?: Pinoy Edition after the network acquired the format from Mark Burnett International. The acquisition came as GMA's sister network Q started airing the American version. The title of the Philippine version came later.

For two episodes in March 2009, Mo Twister temporarily took over the hosting plum for the show after Gibbs called in sick.

Rules and general themes
Rules are roughly the same as the original US version, down the composition of the classroom (although comparatively smaller) and the theme song. The Philippine version also has the same three "cheats" to help the contestant. There are noted differences however.

The ten questions in each game are categorized into several general subjects based on Philippine primary school curriculum which is also approved by the Department of Education (which also checks the questions for the show).

The subjects for the 1st season are:
 English
 Science
 Mathematics
 Filipino
 Sibika at Kultura (Civics and Culture) for Grades 1 to 3 and HEKASI or Heograpiya, Kasaysayan at Sibika (Geography, History, and Civics) for Grades 4 and 5
 Edukasyong Pangtahanan (Home Economics)
 M.A.P.E. (Music, Arts and Physical Education)

The subjects for the 2nd season are:
 English
 Science
 Mathematics
 Filipino
 Sibika at Kultura (Civics and Culture) for Grades 1 to 3 and HEKASI or Heograpiya, Kasaysayan at Sibika (Geography, History, and Civics) for Grades 4 and 5
 Edukasyong Pangtahanan (Home Economics)
 Musika, Sining at Edukasyong Pangkatawan (Music, Arts and P.E.)
 Spelling
Generally, each category is written as "Grade number and subject". Though the show itself is mostly in Filipino, questions are generally in English, except Filipino, Civics, and Home Economics questions which are in Filipino, as these three subjects are all taught in Filipino in most schools in the Philippines. (See Education in the Philippines for further information.)

The Philippine version also uses a slightly similar money board (see table below) to the one used in the US version, except there is no ₱2,000 level, but instead a ₱75,000.

Another notable difference is when the answer to a question is about to be revealed, Janno does not say this orally to the contestant as his American counterpart Jeff Foxworthy does. Instead, the answer is shown on the "blackboard" facing the contestant and the current classmate. In case the contestant chooses to copy the classmate's response, the answer is revealed first before the classmate's response is shown.

Early teasers for the show present ten classmates, all Grade 5 students. They are "Chey," "Jun," "Shari," "Nikki," "Joshua," "Marianne," "AJ," "Elise," "Kim," and "Camille," with their real names shown in the credits. It can be presumed that half of them appear in one episode at a time, since there are only five desks in the classroom. This first batch has "graduated" and the a new batch has been introduced for the second season. They are "David", "Cyb", "Matt", "Bea", "Kaye", "Pauline", "Louis", "Ram", "Brian" and "Kassel".

Furthermore, when the contestant decides to "drop out" (stop and take the money) or "flunks out" (answers incorrectly), the contestant must profess to the camera, "Hindi ako kakasa sa Grade 5." ("I am not tough enough for Grade 5.") The contestant is then given a trophy shaped like a squash, as if the "kalabasa award," a figurative prize of shame, is literally bestowed upon the contestant as consolation ("kalabasa" is a Filipino term for squash which is also used as a slang for those who are "stupid.")

Ratings
According to AGB Nielsen Philippines' Mega Manila household television ratings, the final episode of Kakasa Ka Ba sa Grade 5? scored a 21.2% rating.

Accolades

References

External links
 

2007 Philippine television series debuts
2009 Philippine television series endings
Are You Smarter than a 5th Grader?
Filipino-language television shows
GMA Network original programming
Philippine game shows
Philippine television series based on American television series